Changes is the second album by Catapilla.

Track listing
All music written by Graham Wilson, Robert Calvert, and Anna Meek, except where noted. All lyrics written by Anna Meek.

Side one
"Reflections" - 12:06
"Charing Cross" - 6:45

Side two
"Thank Christ For George" - 12:07
"It Could Only Happen To Me" (music - Wilson, Calvert) - 6:45

Personnel
 Anna Meek – vocals
 Carl Wassard – electric bass
 Graham Wilson – guitar
 Ralph Rolinson – organ, electric piano
 Robert Calvert – electric and acoustic saxophones
 Brian Hanson – drums

References

1972 albums
Catapilla albums
Vertigo Records albums